The Promiseland is the 33rd studio album by country singer Willie Nelson. It reached No. 1 on the US Country Albums chart. He was backed by Clint Strong (guitar,) Mark Yeary (keyboards,) Dennis Hromek (bass,) Biff Adam (drums,) and Jimmy Belken (fiddle) of The Strangers.

Track listing
"Living in the Promiseland" (David Lynn Jones) – 3:18
"I'm Not Trying to Forget You" (Willie Nelson) – 3:17
"Here in My Heart" (Jones) – 3:50
"I've Got the Craziest Feeling" (Floyd Tillman) – 2:54
"No Place But Texas" (Alex Harvey) – 3:22
"You're Only in My Arms (To Cry on My Shoulder)" (Steve Nelson) – 3:16
"Pass It On" (Steve Bivens, Dub Dickerson, Clarence Williams) – 3:10
"Do You Ever Think of Me" (Earl Burtnett, John Cooper, Harry D. Kerr) – 2:17
"Old Fashioned Love" (James P. Johnson, Cecil Mack) – 2:47
"Basin Street Blues" (Spencer Williams) – 4:09
"Bach Minuet in G" (Johann Sebastian Bach) – 1:36

Personnel
Willie Nelson - guitar, arranger, vocals

The Strangers:
Biff Adam - drums
Jimmy Belken - fiddle
Dennis Hromek - bass guitar
Clint Strong - guitar
Mark Yeary - keyboards

and

Ritchie Albright - drums
Johnny Gimble - fiddle
Mickey Raphael - harmonica
Bee Spears - bass guitar
Bobby Arnold - engineer
Paul Buskirk - guitar
Bill Ginn - keyboards
Larry Greenhill - engineer
David Lynn Jones - guitar
John Moran - assistant engineer
Freddy Powers - guitar
Denny Purcell - mastering
Dean Reynolds - double bass
Randee Saint Nicholas - photography
Spencer Starnes - bass guitar
Virginia Team - art direction

Chart performance

1986 albums
Willie Nelson albums
Columbia Records albums